Carex rhizina is a species of Carex.

It is native to temperate Eurasia.

References

External links

rhizina
Flora of Europe
Flora of Asia